There are currently two House of Lords Commissioners for Standards, officers of the United Kingdom House of Lords.  When the post was created in 2010 there was a single commissioner who was "responsible for the independent and impartial investigation of alleged breaches of the House of Lords Code of Conduct". Duties of the Commissioners include investigating potential misuse of expenses and parliamentary facilities. Members' opinions, or the way they express themselves, do not fall within the scope of the code.

The current Commissioners are Martin Jelley QPM and Akbar Khan.

Past commissioners
Paul Kernaghan CBE QPM was appointed in 2010 as the first Commissioner.  Mr Kernaghan previously had a police career culminating in a nine-year period as Chief Constable of Hampshire until 2008, followed by service as Head of Mission for the European Union Police Mission for the Palestinian Territories.
Lucy Scott-Moncrieff, a former president of The Law Society, was appointed for five years from 1 June 2016.

Investigations

See also 
Parliamentary Commissioner for Standards

References

Ombudsmen in the United Kingdom
House of Lords